God of Happiness is a 2015 German-French-Georgian black comedy film directed by Dito Tsintsadze and starring Lasha Bakradze, Elie James Blezes, Nadeshda Brennicke, Tina Meliava and Ufuk Bozkurt.

Plot
The film tells the story of a former film director Georgi (Lasha Bakradze) originally from Georgia who plays minor parts in crowd-scenes. He also earns money on the side as a pimp of Ngudu (Elie James Blezes) – his black friend whose clients are wealthy older women with tastes for BDSM.

The two unsuccessful men are always short of money and live in a dingy apartment in an industrial area on the outskirts of Stuttgart. Ngudu uses magic to communicate with his mother, who lives in an African village. They have so little money that Georgi is even forced to sell Ngudu's beloved God of Happiness statue.

Georgi's 15-year-old daughter Tina (Tina Meliava) who lives in Canada with her mother is coming to visit him for the first time in 10 years. He has always pretended to her that he was a successful actor.

Now Georgi must stage a fake life of a rich movie star for Tina. Ngudu's contacts with rich women help him find a villa and an expensive car for Georgi. Georgi convinces his acquaintance, the wooden-legged coke-snorting vaudeville actress Mia (Nadeshda Brennicke) to play his German wife.

Tina arrives, she is quiet, observant and claims to not speak any German. She also has secrets of her own.

Later their plan becomes in danger when Mia's jealous ex-boyfriend Rocco (Ufuk Bozkurt) arrives and stirs up trouble.

But Tina is not easily deceived and the more Giorgi tries to hold on to his lies, the more the situation threatens to spiral out of control.

Cast
 Lasha Bakradze as Giorgi
 Elie James Blezes as Ngudu
 Nadeshda Brennicke as Mia
 Tina Meliava as Tina
 Ufuk Bozkurt as Rocco

Production

There were some differences in the original script. Georgi character's original name was Guram. Tina was originally written as a son named Rati.

The filming began on 6 August 2013 in Stuttgart. Initially the title was Wettbewerb (Contest). The filming took four weeks.

Some lines which the politically incorrect Mia says in the film were improvised by Nadeshda Brennicke.

Reception

Critical response
The film was praised for its acting and deadpan humor which some critics compared with the work of Aki Kaurismäki.

Jürgen Haase, member of the Biberach Film Festival said that "At the first glance the film appears to be a small-scale story which you think you know but instead develops into one which always has exceptional situations, poetic ideas and a laconic wit where life seems like a game".

Awards
In 2015 it won the grand prize of Biberach Film Festival – the Golden Beaver.
Dito Tsintsadze won the Best Director prize at the VIFF Vienna Independent Film Festival and Ralf M. Mendle received the Best Cinematography award for his work on the film in the year 2016.

References to other films
The film references the 2000 film Lost Killers by Dito Tsintsadze which also stars Lasha Bakradze and Elie James Blezes.

References

External links

2015 films
2015 comedy-drama films
German comedy-drama films
French comedy-drama films
2010s German-language films
Films directed by Dito Tsintsadze
Comedy-drama films from Georgia (country)
2010s French films
2010s German films